The following warm-up matches for the 2016 ICC World Twenty20 were played between 3 March and 15 March between all participants.

References

External links
 T20 World Cup 2016 Schedule with Time
 World T20 2016 Warm-up Schedule
 List of ICC T20 World cup Winners

2016 ICC World Twenty20